Inauguration of Dmitry Medvedev as the President of Russia took place on Wednesday, May 7, 2008. The ceremony was held in the Grand Kremlin Palace and lasted about one hour.

At the ceremony attended by about 2400 guests. These were the ministers and governors, deputies and senators, foreign ambassadors and religious leaders, scientists and artists.

Background

Dmitry Medvedev won the election with more than seventy percent of the votes. He took office two months after the elections.

Ceremony

The ceremony was held under the same scenario as the previous two.

Main part

First introduced Russian flag and the flag of the Russian President, a special copy of the Russian Constitution and the sign of the President of Russia.

Then on the podium were invited Chairman of the Constitutional Court Valery Zorkin, Chairman of the Federation Council Sergey Mironov and Chairman of the State Duma Boris Gryzlov.

At that time, Vladimir Putin, left the residence of the President of Russia and went to the Cathedral Square, where he received a report Kremlin Regiment commander and thanked the soldiers for their service. Then he went to the State Kremlin Palace to attend the ceremony.

Dmitry Medvedev's motorcade arrived at the Kremlin and with the battle Kremlin chimes elected President entered the St George's Hall. After passing through St. George and Alexander Hall, Medvedev took the stage in the hall of St. Andrew.

Speech of Vladimir Putin

The first speech was made by Vladimir Putin:

The Oath

After the speech of Vladimir Putin, Valery Zorkin invited Dmitry Medvedev to take the oath.

Dmitry Medvedev read the text of the oath:

After that, the Russian national anthem sounded, and the Kremlin walls was made Artillery salute of thirty-one salvo.

Speech of Dmitry Medvedev

After taking the oath, and the end of the anthem, Dmitry Medvedev delivered his first speech as President of Russia.

Final part

Dmitry Medvedev and Vladimir Putin went to the closed from outside the room where the outgoing president handed over the new head of state "nuclear briefcase".

After that, Medvedev and Putin came to the Cathedral Square, where the outgoing head of state presented the Kremlin regiment of the new Supreme Commander. Vladimir Putin and Dmitry Medvedev held a parade of troops and, at the end of the ceremony, went to receive congratulations.

Congratulations from Foreign Leaders

With the assumption of office of the President of Russia Dmitry Medvedev congratulated the many foreign leaders. Among them were: US President George W. Bush, Prime Minister of Ukraine Yulia Tymoshenko, Chinese President Hu Jintao and others.

References

Articles containing video clips
Dmitry Medvedev
Medvedev